PROMIS  (Prosecutors Management Information System) was a case management software developed by Inslaw (formerly the Institute for Law and Social Research), a non-profit organization established in 1973 by Bill and Nancy Hamilton. The software program was developed with aid from the Law Enforcement Assistance Administration to aid prosecutors' offices in tracking; in 1982 (by which time Inslaw became a for-profit entity) Inslaw received a $10 million contract by the Justice Department to develop an improved PROMIS application for U.S. attorneys' offices. Having previously developed a 16-bit version of PROMIS, Inslaw developed a 32-bit version, for various operating systems, specifically VAX/VMS, Unix, OS/400, and (in the 1990s) Windows NT.

The Hamiltons and the Justice Department engaged in an "unusually bitter contract dispute" over the software, and Inslaw entered bankruptcy. The Hamiltons sued the federal government, alleging that the Justice Department had dishonestly conspired to "drive Inslaw out of business 'through trickery, fraud and deceit'" by withholding payments to Inslaw and then pirating the software. A bankruptcy court and federal district court agreed with the Hamiltons, although these rulings were later vacated by a court of appeals for jurisdictional reasons. Hamilton and others asserted that the Justice Department had done so in order to modify PROMIS, originally created to manage legal cases, to become a monitoring software for intelligence operations. Affidavits created over the course of the Inslaw affair stated that "PROMIS was then given or sold at a profit to Israel and as many as 80 other countries by Dr. Earl W. Brian, a man with close personal and business ties to then-President Ronald Reagan and then-Presidential counsel Edwin Meese."

In September 1992, a House Judiciary Committee report raised "serious concerns" that Justice Department officials had schemed "to destroy Inslaw and co-opt the rights to its PROMIS software" and had misappropriated the software. The report was the outgrowth of a three-year investigation led by Jack Brooks, the committee's chairman, who had launched in investigation in 1989. The report faulted the Justice Department for a lack of cooperation in the investigation and found that "There appears to be strong evidence, as indicated by the findings in two Federal Court proceedings as well as by the committee investigation, that the Department of Justice 'acted willfully and fraudulently,' and 'took, converted and stole,' Inslaw's Enhanced PROMIS by 'trickery fraud and deceit.'"

A book written in 1997 by Fabrizio Calvi and Thierry Pfister claimed that the National Security Agency (NSA) had been "seeding computers abroad with PROMIS-embedded SMART (Systems Management Automated Reasoning Tools) chips, code-named Petrie, capable of covertly downloading data and transmitting it, using electrical wiring as an antenna, to U.S. intelligence satellites" as part of an espionage operation.

In the early 1980s, Manucher Ghorbanifar and Adnan Khashoggi both had facilitated the transaction of PROMIS software to Khalid bin Mahfouz, a prominent Saudi billionaire. 

The media mogul and alleged Israeli spy Robert Maxwell was involved in selling the PROMIS software.

Further reading
Ryan Gallagher, Dirtier than Watergate: The Reagan-era espionage system that has managed to stay under the radar., New Statesman (April 20, 2011).
James J. Kilpatrick, Odor of a Situation Needing a Probe, Baltimore Sun (August 29, 1991).
Kenn Thomas, Jim Keith: The Octopus: Secret Government and the Death of Danny Casolaro. Feral House 2005, 
Elizabeth Tucker, Inslaw back in business, but loses crucial battle, Washington Post (December 28, 1988).
Cheri Seymour: The Last Circle - Danny Casolaro's Investigation into the Octopus and the PROMIS Software Scandal. Trine Day, 2010.  Googel Books

See also
PRISM (surveillance program)

References

National Security Agency
1970s software
Computer surveillance
Reagan administration controversies
Robert Maxwell